Events in the year 1965 in Turkey.

Parliament
 12th Parliament of Turkey (up to 10 October)
 13th Parliament of Turkey

Incumbents
President – Cemal Gürsel
Prime Minister
İsmet İnönü (up to 20 February)
Suat Hayri Ürgüplü (20 February-27 October)
 Süleyman Demirel (from 27 October)
Leader of the opposition
 Süleyman Demirel (up to 20 February)
 İsmet İnönü (from 20 February)

Ruling party and the main opposition
 Ruling party 
 Republican People's Party (CHP) (up to 20 February)
 A coalition of Justice Party (AP), New Turkey Party (YTP) and Republican Villagers Nation Party (CKMP) and Nation Party (MP) (20 February-27 October)
 Justice Party (AP) (from 27 October)
 Main opposition 
 Justice Party (AP) (up to 20 February)
 Republican People's Party (CHP) (from 20 February)

Cabinet
28th government of Turkey (up to 20 February)
29th government of Turkey (20 February-27 October)
30th government of Turkey (from 27 October)

Events
13 February – Annual budget of the 28th government of Turkey was rejected. (End of İsmet İnönü government and a short-term caretaker government) 
 19 March – Gas explosion in Yeniçeltek mine, Amasya Province. 69 deaths
13 June – Fenerbahçe won the championship of Turkish football league.
 1 July - Road Water Electricity General Directorate was founded.
 10 October – General elections . AP 240 seats, CHP 134 seats, MP 31 seats, YTP 19 seats, TİP 14 seats, CKMP 11 seats, Indep 1 seat. (TİP was the first marxist party to gain seats in Turkish parliament)
 24 October – Census Population 31351421.
 10 November – The Uşak Atatürk Monument is erected.
18 December – Turkey declared that Zürich and London Agreement concerning the Cyprus issue was still in effect

Births
24 February – Tülay Keçialan (Asya), singer
5 April – Aykut Kocaman footballer
18 August – Hayrünnisa Gül, former President Abdullah Gül's wife
12 September – Seden Gürel, singer

Deaths
18 July – Refik Halit Karay (aged 77), novelist
15 August – Zihni Derin (aged 85), agronomist

Gallery

See also
 1964–65 1.Lig

References

 
Years of the 20th century in Turkey